Ekel may refer to:
 Okoličná na Ostrove, known in Hungarian as Ekel, a village in Slovakia
 Ekel (Norden), a part of the town of Norden, Germany
 Fendry Ekel, painter

See also 
 Das Ekel (disambiguation), the title of several works in German
 Ekels, a surname (including a list of persons with the name)